Mangalasutram ( Wedding Chain) is a 1966 Indian Telugu-language drama film, produced and directed by A. K. Velan under the Arunachalam Studios banner. It stars N. T. Rama Rao, Devika  and music composed by T. Chalapathi Rao.

Plot
Joga Rao is a famous lawyer who leads a happy family life with his wife Parvathi and their two children, Raju (N. T. Rama Rao) and Shankar. Once Raju goes to their village where he gets acquainted with Shantha (Devika) and both of them fall in love. Parvathi wants to make her son Raju's marriage with a village girl than her educated niece Kamala. Raju comes back from the village; at the same time, Parvathi reaches there and fixes Raju's marriage with Shantha. Raju doesn't know that his mother fixed the marriage with his lover only, so, he refuses it and takes his father's help. Joga Rao tells him to elope from the house at the time of marriage and he will arrange the marriage with his second son Shankar. But Shankar hears this, he is already in love with a girl Bala, so he immediately marries her. On the day of the marriage, everybody started gossiping that Raju the groom is missing. Shanta's father requests Joga Rao not to spoil his daughter's life and Shanta's stepmother starts shouting, where Joga Rao realizes his foolishness. So, he makes Shanta's marriage with an electric engineer whom he brought up. Shanta faints upon seeing unknown person tying the knot. At that night she tries to commit suicide, the bridegroom saves her and assures her that he will again make her marriage with Raju. Meanwhile, suddenly, the current fails. Being an electrical engineer, he goes to check the fuse, gets electrocuted and dies. The rest of the story is whether Raju comes back and marries Shanta; and what happens in their lives.

Cast
N. T. Rama Rao as Raju
Devika as Shanta
Ramana Reddy as Joga Rao
Padmanabham as Shankar
Ramana Murthy
Perumallu
Geetanjali as Bala
Vasanthi as Kamala
Hemalatha as Parvathi
Nirmalamma

Soundtrack

Music composed by T. Chalapathi Rao. Music released by Audio Company.

References

Indian drama films
Films scored by T. Chalapathi Rao